The maximum is an extreme value in a set.

Maximum may also refer to:

Maximum (MAX album)
Maximum (Murat Boz album)
"Maximum" (song), a song by Murat Boz
Maximum (character), a fictional superhero published by DC Comics
Maximum break in snooker is often known as maximum
The general maximum, an economic policy in the French Revolution
Maximum (film), a 2012 Bollywood movie

See also
 Maxima (disambiguation)
 Maximization (disambiguation)
 Maximus (disambiguation)
 Minimum